Denyse Tontz (born September 17, 1994) is a Salvadoran-American actress, singer, and songwriter. Tontz is known for her roles as Cortney Strathmore on Freeform's The Fosters, Miranda Montgomery on All My Children, Nikki Ortiz on Dog with a Blog, Elena on the 2017 Syfy series Incorporated, and heroine Alicia Mendoza in the 2019 ABC summer series Grand Hotel. She is known in the music world for her single, "United States of Anxiety", debuted in 2016 by People.com.

Personal life
Tontz has a younger sister and a younger brother, and is of Irish, German, Spanish, Salvadorean, Canadian and Mayan descent.

Career

Acting
Before she began her acting career, Tontz was a child model and the face of Barbie couture in the UK. Tontz made her first appearance on television, appearing on the show E-Ring as Princess Gabrielle. In 2007, she portrayed Alice Keefe in the Nickelodeon movie The Last Day of Summer. In 2008, she was cast as Meagan Todd in the movie Dog Gone along with Luke Benward and French Stewart. Tontz began recurring on Big Time Rush in 2009 playing the role of Jennifer Woods. Tontz revealed on August 6, 2012, that Nickelodeon had renewed Big Time Rush for a 13-episode fourth season, a development that was later independently confirmed.

In November 2012 Tontz appeared on the Disney Channel sitcom Dog with a Blog, playing Avery's Central American neighbor and Tyler's crush, Nikki. Nikki is sweet and talented but also initially quite naïve, and her pomeranian Evita becomes the object of Stan's affection. It was later announced that Tontz's character would begin to be recurring.

In early 2013 it was revealed that Tontz would be playing Miranda Montgomery in daytime drama All My Children. The first appearance of Tontz as Miranda Montgomery was on the April 29, 2013 premiere episode of All My Children. On November 11, 2013, it was announced that Prospect Park had closed production and canceled the series again. Tontz later stated that although she had fun, soaps were just not her cup of tea.

In July 2015, Deadline Hollywood announced that Tontz was cast as a series regular in the USA pilot, Paradise Pictures, written and executive produced by Suits writer Rick Muirragui and executive produced by Suits creator/executive producer Aaron Korsh. The show was a period drama revolving around ambitious people striving to get to the top in 1940s Hollywood, and Tontz played a bright-eyed aspiring actress named Luciana from Marfa, Texas. The show did not go to series.

In 2016, it was announced that Tontz would join Matt Damon and Ben Affleck's Syfy thriller, Incorporated, as a series regular, alongside Sean Teale, Allison Miller, Dennis Haysbert and Julia Ormond. Tontz plays Elena, the love of Ben Larson's (Teale) life, who is forced to sell herself into servitude in order to pay off her family's debts. Created by David and Alex Pastor, the show is set in a distant future where corporations have unlimited power.

Since 2019, Tontz has starred as Alicia Mendoza on the ABC drama Grand Hotel.

Music
In 2012, Tontz released the video for her first single, "Better Than Nothing" featuring Thomas Hrvatin, via YouTube. Shot on an iPhone 4S, the song features Tontz's quirky, playful style of writing. "Better Than Nothing" was also featured on the March 24, 2013 episode of The Mentalist.

In June 2014, repped by music industry powerhouse Danny Goldberg of GoldVE, Tontz won a Daytime Emmy Award for Outstanding Original Song for a Drama Series for "Parachute", an original song she wrote for All My Children.

She released her track "Why" on May 5, 2015, her song and video "Go", on July 4, 2015, and most recently "United States of Anxiety", on July 22, 2016.

Filmography

Discography
"Better Than Nothing" (feat. Thomas Hrvatin)
"Use It"
"Mr. Hipster"
"Why" (track only)
"Go"

Music videos

References

External links

1994 births
Living people
Actresses from San Diego
American child actresses
American television actresses
American soap opera actresses
American film actresses
Musicians from San Diego
Singer-songwriters from California
American women singer-songwriters
American women pop singers
21st-century American actresses
21st-century American women singers
American people of Salvadoran descent
21st-century American singers